The 1962 NSWRFL season was the 55th New South Wales Rugby Football League premiership, Australia's first rugby league competition. Ten teams from across Sydney competed for the J J Giltinan Shield and WD & HO Wills Cup during the season, which culminated in a replay of the previous year's grand final between St. George and Western Suburbs.

The 1962 season was also the last in the playing career of future Australian Rugby League Hall of Fame inductee, Brian Carlson.

Teams

Regular season

Bold – Home game
X – Bye
Opponent for round listed above margin

Ladder

Ladder progression

Numbers highlighted in green indicate that the team finished the round inside the top 4.
Numbers highlighted in blue indicates the team finished first on the ladder in that round.
Numbers highlighted in red indicates the team finished last place on the ladder in that round.

Finals

Grand Final

Wests had finished third on the ladder but won two semi-finals for another crack at their nemesis in a rain-soaked and muddy Grand Final. St George were favoured by a strong breeze in the first half which dropped off in the second half, giving Wests no reciprocal advantage.

The only try of the match was scored in the 17th minute after Norm Provan burst through and found Kevin Ryan in support who in turn found Johnny King on the fly. The winger raced 30 yards over sodden ground to score, notching up another Grand Final try in his unblemished consistent record.

The score was 7–2 at half time, with the Dragons playing almost all the second half with twelve men after Billy “Bluey” Wilson was sent off.

The match was a tight forward struggle with misdemeanors from both sides. Provan and Rasmussen finished the game needing stitches and Jim Cody and Garry Russell suffered broken noses. Wests did all they could to contain Reg Gasnier with Gill McDougall enjoying some success in hammering Gasnier and keeping him bottled up.

Saints' best were Ryan, Ian Walsh and Johnny Raper playing at five-eighth in place of Brian Clay whose injury prone season had ended early with a broken arm.

The game is remembered for a couple of off-the-ball incidents which began with Provan being knocked out by Jim Cody five minutes before half time. “Sticks” Provan was carried from the field and didn't return again until well into the second half. Cody escaped any official punishment. Wilson came out as captain in the second half and apparently squared things up in the first seconds after kick-off before the first tackle took place. Accounts differ as to whether “Bluey” Wilson was provoked by Cody before Wilson hit him, but hit him he did and referee Jack Bradley sent Wilson off. With no replacements allowed in those days, St George were reduced to 11 men until Provan returned to the field 15 minutes later.

In what can only be described as a heroic defensive effort, St George held out Wests and won the match.

The match was Billy Wilson's final game for St George; he had appeared in six of the Grand Final victories. The Larry Writer reference suggests that the send-off may have soured Wilson's relationship with club officials in spite of the victory. Whether true or not, at 35 years of age, the end of Wilson's playing career was looming from the club's perspective and his contract was not renewed.

As of the 2015 NRL season, no forward since Wilson has been sent off in a Grand Final. In this game Wilson also became the only man to have been sent off in two grand finals following on from his dismissal by Darcy Lawler in 1953 for fighting with South Sydney's Martin Gallagher.

 St. George 9 (Tries: King. Goals: McDonald 3.)

Western Suburbs 6 ( Goals: Bray 3.)

Player statistics
The following statistics are as of the conclusion of Round 18.

Top 5 point scorers

Top 5 try scorers

Top 5 goal scorers

References

External links
 Rugby League Tables - Season 1962 The World of Rugby League
 Writer, Larry (1995) Never Before, Never Again, Pan MacMillan, Sydney
Results - 1961-70 at rabbitohs.com.au
1962 J J Giltinan Shield and WD HO Wills Cup at rleague.com
NSWRFL season 1962 at rugbyleagueproject.com
St. George 1962 season at showroom.com.au

New South Wales Rugby League premiership
NSWRFL season